Ken Merckx (born June 24, 1964) is an American voice and screen actor who is also known as Ken Merchx and Ken Ring. He has done voicework for various Power Rangers series, but is perhaps best known for his role of Count Dregon in the short-lived Saban Masked Rider series, as well as his role as the voice of the Org General Nayzor in Power Rangers: Wild Force. He has also appeared on-screen as Dr. Michael Zaskin, a recurring role in Power Rangers: Time Force.

Merckx is also a stage combat instructor and fight choreographer who has taught at AMDA College of the Performing Arts in Los Angeles and staged scenes for a number of theater productions.

Filmography

Live action/television roles
 18 Wheels of Justice - Angelo (ep. A Prize Possession)
 Almost Perfect - Waiter (ep. Dating for Ratings)
 Becker - Waiter (ep. Point of Contract)
 JAG - Jogger (ep. Jagathon)
 Masked Rider - Count Dregon, Dregonator (voice) (credited as Ken Ring)
 Mighty Morphin Power Rangers - Count Dregon, Repellator (voices, uncredited)
 Power Rangers in Space - Waspicable, Lionizer (voices, uncredited)
 Power Rangers Lightspeed Rescue - Ghouligan, Moleman (voices)
 Power Rangers Lost Galaxy - Hardtochoke (1st voice)
 Power Rangers Time Force - Dr. Michael Zaskin
 Power Rangers Turbo - Shadow Chromite, Translucitor (voices, uncredited)
 Power Rangers Wild Force - Nayzor/Super Nayzor (voice)
 Veronica Mars - Paparazzi (ep. Lord of the Bling)
 Big Bad Beetleborgs - Ben (ep. 18), Phantom (Ep. 35)

Movie roles
 Vice Academy Part 3 - Officer #1
 Mind, Body & Soul - Police Officer
 The Boys of Cellblock Q - Boss
 Out of the Darkness - Cop #2
 Orgazmo - Original Orgazmo
 Without Limits - Eugene Register reporter
 Breathing Hard - Danny
 The Tomorrow Man - Dom
 Outta Time - Patrolman
 Hunter: Back in Force'' - Robber #1

References

External links
 

1964 births
Living people
American film actors
American male television actors
American male voice actors